Roman Bílek (born 29 September 1967) is a retired Czech race walker.

He was born in Ostrava and represented the club AK Kroměříž. He finished 21st at the 1994 European Championships and 45th at the 2008 Olympic Games, both in the 50 kilometres race. He also competed at the IAAF World Race Walking Cup in 1997 and 2008 in the 20 kilometres race. He became Czech champion in 1994.

References

1967 births
Living people
Czech male racewalkers
Athletes (track and field) at the 2008 Summer Olympics
Olympic athletes of the Czech Republic
Sportspeople from Ostrava